Francesco Matteo Golfo (born 5 September 1994) is an Italian football player. He plays for  club Picerno.

Club career
Golfo spent the first 7 seasons of his career with Pianese in Serie D.

On 6 July 2018, he signed a three-year contract with Serie A club Parma.

On 8 August 2018, he joined Serie C club Trapani on a season-long loan. He made his Serie C debut for Trapani on 18 September 2018 on in a game against Reggina as a starter and scored twice on his debut. The loan was renewed on 29 July 2019.

On 24 January 2020 he joined Serie C club Potenza on loan until the end of the 2019–20 season.

On 8 September 2020 he was loaned to Juve Stabia. On 29 January 2021 he moved on a new loan to Catania.

On 31 August 2021, he joined Vibonese.

On 29 July 2022, Golfo moved to Picerno.

References

External links
 

1994 births
Footballers from Palermo
Living people
Italian footballers
Association football forwards
Parma Calcio 1913 players
Trapani Calcio players
Potenza Calcio players
S.S. Juve Stabia players
Catania S.S.D. players
U.S. Vibonese Calcio players
AZ Picerno players
Serie B players
Serie C players
Serie D players